Frederick Hemming McClintock (13 March 1926 – 22 May 1994) was a British criminologist.

In 1960 he was Assistant Director of Research at the University of Cambridge, Institute of Criminology. While there he worked on research for Crimes of Violence: an enquiry by the Cambridge Institute of Criminology into crimes of violence against the person in London, published by Macmillan in 1963. He was Dean of the Faculty of Law from 1982–1985.

McClintock was a council member of the Scottish Association for Victim Support Schemes (SAVSS), and was a member of the Perks Committee on Criminal Statistics.

He is buried in the Parish of the Ascension Burial Ground in Cambridge.

References

External links
 
 

1926 births
1994 deaths
British criminologists